A lesene, also called a pilaster strip, is an architectural term for a narrow, low-relief vertical pillar on a wall. It resembles a pilaster, but does not have a base or capital. It is typical in Lombardic and Rijnlandish architectural building styles.

Function 
Lesenes are used in architecture to vertically divide a façade or other wall surface optically. However, unlike pilasters, lesenes are simpler, having no bases or capitals. Their function is ornamental, not just to decorate the plain surface of a wall but, in the case of corner lesenes (at the edges of a façade), to emphasise the edges of a building.

Gallery

References 

Architectural elements